The 1888 Navy Midshipmen football team represented the United States Naval Academy during the 1888 college football season. The team compiled a 1–4 record and were outscored by its opponents 73 to 35.  In the eighth installment of the Johns Hopkins–Navy football rivalry, Navy lost by a 25 to 12 score.  In the final game of the 1888 season, the Midshipmen lost to St. John's College by a 22–6 score, with a brawl breaking out at the end of the game. The team captain was George Hayward.

Schedule

References

Navy
Navy Midshipmen football seasons
Navy Midshipmen football